Tairat Bunsuk (born 11 January 1993) is a Thai Olympic weightlifter. He represented his country at the 2014 and 2015 world championships and 2016 Summer Olympics.

Major results

References

Tairat Bunsuk
Weightlifters at the 2016 Summer Olympics
Tairat Bunsuk
Weightlifters at the 2010 Summer Youth Olympics
Weightlifters at the 2014 Asian Games
1993 births
Living people
World Weightlifting Championships medalists
Tairat Bunsuk
Tairat Bunsuk
Southeast Asian Games medalists in weightlifting
Weightlifters at the 2018 Asian Games
Competitors at the 2013 Southeast Asian Games
Tairat Bunsuk
Tairat Bunsuk
Tairat Bunsuk
Tairat Bunsuk